Luis Otávio de Oliveira (born 17 February 2000), commonly known as Echaporã, is a Brazilian footballer who plays as a forward for Juventude, on loan from Atlético Mineiro.

Club career
Born in Echaporã, São Paulo, he represented São Paulo and Figueirense as a youth. He made his first team debut with the latter on 6 March 2019, coming on as a second-half substitute for Alípio in a 0–0 Campeonato Catarinense away draw against Marcílio Dias.

In September 2019, Echaporã moved Atlético Mineiro on loan with a buyout clause, and returned to the youth setup. On 14 November 2020, his loan was extended until the end of 2022.

Echaporã made his debut for Galo on 28 February 2021; after replacing Sávio, he scored his team's third in a 3–0 home win against URT, for the year's Campeonato Mineiro. His Série A debut occurred on 13 June, as he replaced Keno in a 1–0 home success over São Paulo. He signed a permanent two-year deal with Atlético in January 2022.

On 5 April 2022, Echaporã joined Série B club Ponte Preta on loan for the remainder of the season.

Career statistics

Honours
Atlético Mineiro
Campeonato Brasileiro Série A: 2021
Copa do Brasil: 2021
Campeonato Mineiro: 2021, 2022
Supercopa do Brasil: 2022
Campeonato Brasileiro Sub-20: 2020

References

External links
Atlético Mineiro profile 

2001 births
Living people
Footballers from São Paulo (state)
Brazilian footballers
Association football forwards
Campeonato Brasileiro Série A players
Campeonato Brasileiro Série B players
Figueirense FC players
Clube Atlético Mineiro players
Associação Atlética Ponte Preta players
Esporte Clube Juventude players